Caldesia parnassifolia, is an aquatic species in the Alismataceae. It is found in slow-moving fresh water.

Distribution and habitat
Caldesia parnassifolia occurs in lakes and ponds. It is known from Asian fresh waters of across much of Europe, Asia, Africa and Australia, from France to the Russian Far East and south to Botswana, Madagascar and Queensland.
It is now extinct in Austria, Bulgaria and Switzerland.

The leaves of Caldesia parnassifolia (Alisma reniforme) can be affected by the water-born fungi, Doassansiopsis martianoffiana.

References

Freshwater plants
Alismataceae
Flora of Europe
Flora of temperate Asia
Flora of tropical Asia
Flora of Queensland
Flora of Madagascar
Flora of Africa
Plants described in 1767